Engine House No. 8 was a historic fire station located at Baltimore, Maryland, United States. It was a two-story masonry building with a cast-iron street front, erected in 1871 in the Italianate style.  The front featured a simple cornice with a central iron element bearing the legend "No. 8". Engine Company No. 8 operated from this building until 1912.  In 1928 it became the motorcycle shop of Louis M. Helm and the upper story functioned as a clubhouse for a series of boys’ clubs into the 1940s.

Engine House No. 8 was listed on the National Register of Historic Places in 1995. About 2002, the property was sold and the building was torn down. However, the cast-iron facade was saved, and the first floor cast-iron components were installed at the Fire Museum of Maryland, where the fire house has been put back together.

See also
Fire departments in Maryland
Engine House No. 6 (Baltimore, Maryland)
Paca Street Firehouse
Poppleton Fire Station

References

External links
, including photo from 1990, at Maryland Historical Trust

Fire stations completed in 1871
Fire stations on the National Register of Historic Places in Maryland
Government buildings on the National Register of Historic Places in Baltimore
Cast-iron architecture in Baltimore
Italianate architecture in Maryland
Historic American Buildings Survey in Baltimore
Poppleton, Baltimore